Following two inquiries which involved over a hundred eyewitnesses, the Italian Dominican theologian and philosopher Thomas Aquinas (1225–1274) was formally canonized as a saint of the Roman Catholic Church on 18 July 1323 by Pope John XXII. His corpse was boiled and his remains were distributed as relics, the ownership of which was contested for decades. In 1324, he became the second most important saint in the Dominican Order, after Saint Dominic himself. In 1969, the feast day of Saint Thomas Aquinas was revised from 7 March to 28 January.

Death
En route to the Second Council of Lyon, Thomas Aquinas died on the morning of 7 March 1274 at the Cistercian abbey of Fossanova. His funeral, which was organized by the Cistercians, concluded hours later and he was buried in the monastery. Following the news of his death, devotees rushed to his tomb, where multiple miracles were reported. Thomas' last words were reportedly "This is my rest for ever and ever", which the Cistercians interpreted as proof of his belonging to Fossanova. Anxious not to cede ownership of Thomas' body to the Dominicans, the Cistercians relocated it several times; in the process, Thomas' head was removed, while his right hand was cut off and given to one of his sisters.

Inquiries
In 1303,  petitioned for Pope Benedict XI to initiate inquiries into Thomas' canonization, although the Pope died before any formal processes could begin. In 1317, the Sicilian Dominican vicar Robert of San Valention expressed interest in compiling a profile of Thomas' life and miracles which would be presented to Pope John XXII. Robert entrusted Guillelmo de Tocco and Robert the Lector with the task, which began in around November; by the following summer, the Dominicans had received an audience with the pope. After a formal presentation by the Dominicans and an examination of the evidence by a panel appointed by John XXII, the pope formally began the first inquiry into the canonization of Thomas Aquinas. 

On 13 September 1318, the pope nominated the Archbishop of Naples, Umberto, the Bishop of Viterbo, Angelo, and a notary, Pandulpho de Sabbello as the commissioners of the inquiry. de Tocco continued working at Fossanova Abbey until 15 July 1319, although owing to the archbishop's old age and poor health, the actual inquiry was held at Umberto's residence in Naples. It commenced on 21 July 1319 and ended on 18 September 1319; de Sabbello―having been unable to travel to Naples―was absent throughout. The other two commissioners heard witness testimonies from 23 July until 16 August; among some 42 depositions, a soldier under Robert, King of Naples alleged that he regained mobility in his limbs after visiting the tomb of Thomas Aquinas, while a church elder claimed that his relative recovered "from the tumour in her throat" after hearing the tolling of the bell of Fossanova and praying to Thomas for healing. Other witnesses reported receiving visions of Thomas' last breath.

The transcript of the first inquiry was sealed and delivered to the pope, who then approved a second inquiry on 23 June 1321. de Sabbello remained on the commission and was joined by the Bishop of Agnani, Peter Ferri, and the Bishop of Terracina, Andrew. The second inquiry, which was held at Fossanova, lasted from 10 November to 27 November, during which over a hundred witnesses were called to testify. Thereafter, Guillelmo de Tocco is believed to have either died or fallen gravely ill, since he did not return to meet the pope and was replaced by John of Naples. In July 1323, more than two years after the second and last inquiry, the pope finally approved the canonization of Thomas Aquinas.

Canonization and aftermath

The canonization of Thomas Aquinas was commemorated on two occasions. The first ceremony took place on 14 July 1323 at the Palais des Papes in Avignon and was attended by members of the royal family led by Robert, King of Naples, and his wife, Sancia of Majorca. The pope began a series of sermons praising Thomas. The second ceremony was held on 18 July 1323 at the Avignon Cathedral and was attended by the entire Avignon clergy alongside Robert and his wife. The pope began by preaching on Psalm 85; after the singing of "Veni Creator Spiritus", he formally announced the canonization of Thomas. The proceedings ended with the singing of "Te Deum", "In medio ecclesie", and "Os iusti". The day was celebrated "as if it were Christmas" all across Avignon, especially in Dominican churches. The canonization bull, published on the same day, declared that Thomas' feast day would be celebrated on 7 March.

The canonization was fiercely contested by the Franciscans, who rejected the doctrines of Thomas; according to tradition, a Franciscan friar stated that he "would prefer to die before seeing the day when Thomas was canonized" and remarkably died a day after the canonization. Following the canonization of Thomas Aquinas, his body was boiled, possibly in wine. By 1323, his head had been transferred from Fossanova to the Church of San Benedetto in nearby Priverno, of which Thomas also became patron saint.

In 1324, the general chapter of the Dominican Order convened to discuss the veneration of Saint Thomas Aquinas. They agreed that he would be exalted as one of the greatest Dominican saints, surpassing Peter of Verona and placed just behind Saint Dominic in importance. Thomas' feast day was confirmed by the chapter in 1326, with the liturgy—one prayer and nine lections—finalized by 1328. In 1348, the count of Fondi, Onorato I Caetani, obtained the remains of Thomas Aquinas from the Cistercians. In 1369, after close to a century of controversy, and at the behest of Pope Urban V, the fifty bones of Thomas' corpse were handed over to the French Dominicans in Toulouse. Although initially housed at the Church of the Jacobins, the remains were moved to the Basilica of Saint-Sernin during the French Revolution in 1789 and only returned to the Church of the Jacobins in 1974. In 1969, Thomas' feast day was moved from 7 March, which often coincided with Lent, to 28 January, the date of his translation to France.

Veneration
On 11 April 1567, Pope Pius V declared him as dDoctor of the Church with the bull Mirabilis Deus. Pius V elevated his anniversary to the rank of that of four other Fathers of the Latin Church: Saint Ambrose, Saint Augustine of Hippo, Saint Jerome and Saint Gregory I. During the Council of Trent he had the honor of having his Summa Theologiae displayed on the altar together with the Bible and other decretals.

On August 4, 1880, with the bull Cum hoc sit, Thomas was declared patron of all Catholic educational institutions. On 1 September 1910, Pope Pius X promulgated the bull Sacrorum Antistitum, addressed to all bishops and teachers of religious orders, with which he ordered that the Scholastic philosophy of St. Thomas be "established as the foundation of sacred studies" of young clerics. On June 29, 1914, a motu proprio signed by Saint Pius X asked Catholic philosophy professors to teach the principles of Thomism in schools and universities; moreover, he ordered that the professors of sacred theology in schools, high schools, seminaries, universities and institutes which confer academic degrees and doctorates in this science adopt the Summa Theologica as a textbook and explain it in Latin. In the same year, the Roman Congregation of Seminaries and Universities promulgated a list of 24 theses on Thomism considered as norme directivæ tutæ.

To Aquinas were dedicated the encyclicals Aeterni Patris of Pope Leo XIII and Studiorum Ducem of Pope Pius XI.
The Second Vatican Council, with the decree Optatam Totius'' (on the formation of priests, at n°. 16), proposed an authentic interpretation on the teaching of the popes on the subject of Thomism, requiring that the theological formation of priests be done with Thomas of Aquinas as the main teacher.

References

Citations

Bibliography

 
 
 
 
 
 
 

Thomas Aquinas
Roman Catholic canonizations by person
14th-century Catholicism